The 1992 AFL Foster's Cup was the Australian Football League pre-season cup competition played in its entirety before the 1992 season began.

Games

1st Round

|- bgcolor="#CCCCFF"
| Home team
| Home team score
| Away team
| Away team score
| Ground
| Crowd
| Date
|- bgcolor="#FFFFFF"
| Richmond
| 12.11 (83)
| Brisbane
| 10.7 (67)
| Waverley Park
| 14,926
| Saturday, 8 February
|- bgcolor="#FFFFFF"
| West Coast
| 14.13 (97)
|  Collingwood
| 8.15 (63)
| Marrara Oval
| 11,000
| Sunday, 9 February
|- bgcolor="#FFFFFF"
| Geelong
| 9.20 (74)
| St Kilda
| 9.17 (71)
| Waverley Park
| 20,916
| Wednesday, 12 February
|- bgcolor="#FFFFFF"
| Footscray
| 15.13 (103)
|  Melbourne
| 7.19 (61)
| Waverley Park
| 14,596
| Saturday, 15 February
|- bgcolor="#FFFFFF"
| Carlton
| 7.8 (50)
| Adelaide
| 14.6 (90)
| Football Park
| 35,225
| Wednesday, 19 February
|- bgcolor="#FFFFFF"
| Essendon
| 11.11 (77)
| Sydney
| 20.18 (138)
| Lavington Oval
| 13,500
| Saturday, 22 February
|- bgcolor="#FFFFFF"
| Fitzroy
| 13.12 (90)
| North Melbourne
| 12.16 (88)
| North Hobart Oval
| 5,256
| Sunday, 23 February

Quarter-finals

|- bgcolor="#CCCCFF"
| Home team
| Home team score
| Away team
| Away team score
| Ground
| Crowd
| Date
|- bgcolor="#FFFFFF"
| Hawthorn
| 20.12 (132)
|  Richmond
| 15.14 (104)
| Waverley Park
| 21,893
| Saturday, 22 February
|- bgcolor="#FFFFFF"
| Geelong
| 15.9 (99)
|  West Coast
| 11.12 (78)
| Waverley Park
| 8,367
| Wednesday, 26 February
|- bgcolor="#FFFFFF"
| Footscray
| 9.7 (61)
| Adelaide
| 15.10 (100)
| Waverley Park
| 10,765
| Saturday, 29 February
|- bgcolor="#FFFFFF"
| Fitzroy
| 10.15 (75)
| Sydney
| 2.5 (17)
| Waverley Park
| 5,280
| Sunday, 1 March

Semi-finals

|- bgcolor="#CCCCFF"
| Home team
| Home team score
| Away team
| Away team score
| Ground
| Crowd
| Date
|- bgcolor="#FFFFFF"
|  Geelong
| 12.9 (81)
| Hawthorn
| 20.14 (134)
| Waverley Park
| 20,103
| Wednesday, 4 March
|- bgcolor="#FFFFFF"
| Fitzroy
| 15.5 (95)
| Adelaide
| 9.10 (64)
| Waverley Park
| 7,639
| Friday, 6 March

Final

|- bgcolor="#CCCCFF"
| Home team
| Home team score
| Away team
| Away team score
| Ground
| Crowd
| Date
|- bgcolor="#FFFFFF"
| Fitzroy
| 8.15 (63)
| Hawthorn
| 19.14 (128)
| Waverley Park
| 49,453
| Saturday, 14 March

See also

List of Australian Football League night premiers
1992 AFL season

References

Australian Football League pre-season competition
Fosters Cup, 1992